Michael Kerr (born 23 April 1974) is a German international rugby union player, playing for the RG Heidelberg in the Rugby-Bundesliga and the German national rugby union team. He is originally from New Zealand and qualified to play for Germany after five years of residence in the country.

He made his last game for Germany against a Welsh Districts XV on 24 February 2007. He has also played for Germany's rugby league team, being threatened with a ban by the German rugby union coach if he did so.

Kerr, the nephew of the late Bruce Kerr, a legendary player and coach of SC Neuenheim also played for this club, but missed the 2008-09 season because of a back injury. For the 2009-10 season, he moved to the Heidelberger TV, a team just relegated from the 2nd Rugby-Bundesliga, to help the club return to the second division.

Stats
Michael Kerr's personal statistics in club and international rugby:

Club

 As of 25 August 2011

National team

 As of 5 April 2010

References

External links
   Michael Kerr at totalrugby.de

1974 births
Living people
New Zealand rugby union players
German people of New Zealand descent
Naturalized citizens of Germany
Germany national rugby league team players
Dual-code rugby internationals
SC Neuenheim players
Heidelberger TV players
RG Heidelberg players
Rugby union flankers
New Zealand expatriate rugby league players
Expatriate rugby union players in Germany
Germany international rugby union players
New Zealand expatriate rugby union players
New Zealand expatriate sportspeople in Germany